The São Tomé River is a river of Mato Grosso state in western Brazil. It is a tributary of the Juruena River.

All of the river's sources are in the  Juruena National Park, one of the largest conservation units in Brazil.
The São Tomé basin occupies 23% of the park.

See also
List of rivers of Mato Grosso

References

Brazilian Ministry of Transport

Rivers of Mato Grosso